Mexico's first female state governor was Griselda Álvarez Ponce de León,
who was elected chief executive of the state of Colima for the 1979–85 period. Others have followed since:

List

Baja California: Governor of Baja California
Marina del Pilar Ávila Olmeda, MORENA, 1 November 2021 Colima: Governor of Colima
Griselda Álvarez, PRI, 1 November 1979–31 October 1985
Distrito Federal: Head of Government of the Federal District
Rosario Robles Berlanga, PRD, 30 September 1999–4 December 2000 (interim/unelected) 
Claudia Sheinbaum, MORENA, 5 December 2018–present 

Puebla: Governor of Puebla
Martha Erika Alonso Hidalgo, PAN, 14 December 2018 – 24 December 2018 (died in office)

Sonora: Governor of Sonora
 Claudia Pavlovich, PRI, 13 September 2015–present

Tlaxcala: Governor of Tlaxcala
Beatriz Paredes Rangel, PRI, 15 January 1987–11 April 1992

Governor of Quintana Roo
Mara Lezama Espinosa, MORENA, 25 September 2022–present
Yucatán: Governor of Yucatán
Dulce María Sauri Riancho, PRI, 14 February 1991–1 December 1994 (interim/unelected)
Ivonne Ortega Pacheco, PRI, 1 August 2007–30 September 2012
Zacatecas: Governor of Zacatecas
Amalia García Medina, PRD, 12 September 2004–11 September 2010

See also
States of Mexico
List of Mexican state governors

Women
List
Mexico
State governors